Liselotte Spreng (15 February 1912 in Biel/Bienne, canton of Berne – 25 November 1992 in Villars-sur-Glâne, canton of Fribourg) was a Swiss women's rights activist and politician. She was the first female National Councillor from the canton of Fribourg.

Life and career
Liselotte Spreng was born in 1912 in Biel/Bienne to a physician. She studied medicine at the universities of Berne and Lausanne and opened a surgery with her husband in Fribourg in 1941. She was among the first women physicians in the canton.

Spreng campaigned for women's suffrage and became the chairwoman of the Fribourg Organisation for Women's Suffrage in 1967. After women's suffrage was introduced in the canton of Fribourg in 1971, Spreng represented The Liberals in the Grand Council of Fribourg. In 1971, she was elected as the first female representative of the canton of Fribourg to the National Council, where she sat until 1983. She was primarily involved family law, charity, medicine and ethics.

See also
List of members of the Federal Assembly from the Canton of Fribourg
List of the first women holders of political offices in Europe

References

External links
 
 

20th-century Swiss women politicians
20th-century Swiss politicians
Swiss suffragists
FDP.The Liberals politicians
Women members of the National Council (Switzerland)
People from Biel/Bienne
1912 births
1992 deaths